Ian Campbell Bradley (born 28 May 1950) is a British academic, author and broadcaster.

He is Emeritus Professor of Cultural and Spiritual History at the University of St Andrews, where he was Principal of St Mary's College and honorary Church of Scotland Chaplain.

The author of over 35 books, Bradley has written widely on cultural and spiritual matters, including Celtic Christianity, hymns, carols, Gilbert and Sullivan and musical theatre.

Life and career

Early life and education
Bradley was born in Berkhamsted, Hertfordshire, on Whit Sunday 1950, the first of two sons of civil servants William Ewart Bradley and Mary Campbell Tyre. He grew up in the southeast of England and was educated at Tonbridge School and New College, Oxford, where he graduated with a  "congratulatory first" in 1971 in modern history. He remained at the University of Oxford to complete a doctoral thesis on religion and politics in early nineteenth-century Britain, earning his DPhil degree. He stood as the Liberal candidate for Sevenoaks at the February 1974 general election, coming second place.

Career
After leaving Oxford, Bradley took up a post as a general trainee with the BBC. He spent six years on the staff of The Times as a feature writer and leader writer. He has lived in Scotland since 1986. Following further study at the University of St Andrews, from which he graduated with a first-class honours BD degree in theology in 1989, Bradley was ordained to the ministry of the Church of Scotland in 1990, and served as Head of Religious Broadcasting for BBC Scotland between 1990 and 1993.

Having lectured on church history at the University of Aberdeen for many years, Bradley was appointed to a position at the University of St Andrews in 1998, where he was later awarded a Chair in Cultural and Spiritual History in its School of Divinity, where he was previously Principal of St Mary's College, St Andrews. He retired in 2017. He was also associate minister of Holy Trinity Church, St Andrews, and honorary Church of Scotland chaplain for the university. He sat on the committee that drafted the Church of Scotland's Hymnary (Fourth Edition), which was published in 2005. Bradley has taught in the areas of Christianity in contemporary Britain; hymnody, liturgy and worship; monarchy, church and state; and the theology of musical theatre. According to his profile in his 1997 book Abide with Me, he was one of the first lecturers to teach an honors course on hymnology at a British University. In 2013, Bradley was appointed a Commissioner on the Commission on Religion and Belief in British Public Life.

As a journalist, Bradley has contributed to The Guardian, The Daily Telegraph, The Tablet and Life and Work as well as often appearing on Songs of Praise and BBC Radio 4. In 2007, he was awarded a Prize for Outstanding Religious Broadcasting for his BBC Radio 4 documentary on the English hymnal. Bradley frequently writes, broadcasts and lectures about Gilbert and Sullivan and is a regular speaker at the International Gilbert and Sullivan Festivals in Buxton and Harrogate, England.

Bradley is the author of more than 35 books. He is married and has two children.

Bibliography
 The Call to Seriousness: The Evangelical Impact on the Victorians (1976)
 William Morris and His World (1978)
 The Optimists: Themes and Personalities in Victorian Liberalism (1980)
 Breaking the mould?: The Birth and Prospects of the Social Democratic Party (1981) 
 The English Middle Classes are Alive and Kicking (1982)
 The Strange Rebirth of Liberal Britain (1986)
 O Love That Wilt Not Let Me Go (1990)
 The Penguin Book of Hymns (1990)
 God Is Green: Christianity and the Environment (1990)
 Marching to the Promised Land: Has the Church a Future? (1992)
 The Celtic Way (1993)
 The Power of Sacrifice (1995)
 The Complete Annotated Gilbert & Sullivan (1996)
 Columba: Pilgrim and Penitent (1996)
 Abide With Me: The World of Victorian Hymns (1997)
 Celtic Christianity: Making Myths and Chasing Dreams (1999)
 The Penguin Book of Carols (2000)
 Colonies of Heaven: Celtic Models for Today's Church (2000)
 God Save the Queen: The Spiritual Dimension of Monarchy (2002)
 You've Got to Have a Dream: The Message of the Musical (2002)
 Oh Joy! Oh Rapture! The Enduring Phenomenon of Gilbert and Sullivan (2005)
 Believing in Britain: The Spiritual Identity of 'Britishness''' (2006)
 The Daily Telegraph Book of Hymns (2006)
 The Daily Telegraph Book of Carols (2006)
 Enlightened Entrepreneurs: Business Ethics in Victorian Britain (2007)
 Pilgrimage: A Spiritual and Cultural Journey (2009)
 Grace, Order, Openness and Diversity: Reclaiming Liberal Theology (2010)
 Water Music: Making Music in the Spas of Europe and North America (2010)
 Water: A Spiritual History (2012)
 Lost Chords and Christian Soldiers: The Sacred Music of Arthur Sullivan (2013)
 Argyll: The Making of a Spiritual Landscape (2015)
 The Fife Pilgrim Way: In the Footsteps of Monks, Miners and Martyrs (2019)
 Following the Celtic Way: A New Assessment of Celtic Christianity (2020)
 Health, Hedonism and Hypochondria: The Hidden History of Spas (2020) 
 Arthur Sullivan: A Life of Divine Emollient (2021)
 The Quiet Haven: An anthology of readings on death and heaven (2021)
 The Coffin Roads: Journeys to the West'' (2022)

References

External links
Inaugural Lecture as Professor of Cultural and Spiritual History at University of St Andrews
Graduation address: The Very Revd Professor Ian Bradley
Bradley at TEDxUniversityofStAndrews 2013
Bradley profile at Faber & Faber
Bradley's Guardian articles
Bradley's Tablet articles

Living people
1950 births
People educated at Tonbridge School
Alumni of New College, Oxford
Religious studies scholars
Academics of the University of Aberdeen
Academics of the University of St Andrews
20th-century Ministers of the Church of Scotland
University and college chaplains in the United Kingdom
People associated with Gilbert and Sullivan
Scottish Calvinist and Reformed theologians
20th-century British theologians
21st-century British theologians
People from Berkhamsted
21st-century Ministers of the Church of Scotland